Malakhova is a rural locality (a village) in Oshibskoye Rural Settlement, Kudymkarsky District, Perm Krai, Russia. The population was 15 in 2010.

Geography 
It is located 45 km north from Kudymkar.

References 

Rural localities in Kudymkarsky District